Mataara is a settlement in Kenya's Central Province.

References 

 https://github.com/KenyanGeek

Populated places in Central Province (Kenya)